Daun, Germany is a town in the Vulkaneifel district in Rhineland-Palatinate.

Daun may also refer to:

Places
 Daun (Verbandsgemeinde), a collective municipality in Vulkaneifel, Rhineland-Palatinate, Germany
 Kreis Daun, the former name of the district Vulkaneifel in Germany

People with the surname
 Count Leopold Joseph von Daun (1705–1766), Austrian field marshal
 Count Wirich Philipp von Daun (1669–1741), Austrian field marshal

nl:Daun